SF7 or variation may refer to:

 , U.S. Navy V-4_class submarine
 Pentax SF7, 35mm SLR camera
 SF Motors SF7, sport utility sedan
 .SF7, image ROM format file extension for the SF-7000